Elisabeth Nikiema (born February 18, 1982) is a Burkinabé swimmer, who specialized in sprint freestyle events. She has competed for her country at the 2008 Summer Olympics in Beijing, China.

Swimming career
Nikiema was victorious at the Burkina Faso national swimming championships in July 2008, beating Fabienne Ouattara.

She was invited by FINA to compete as a lone female swimmer for Burkina Faso in the 50 m freestyle at the 2008 Summer Olympics in Beijing, China.  Nikiema competed in the second heat of the competition, finishing in sixth place. Her time of 34.98 seconds set a new national record, having promised to beat her own record prior to the race taking place. She had finished ahead of Elsie Uwamahoro of Burundi (36.86 seconds) and Niger's Mariama Souley Bana (40.83 seconds). The heat was won by Zakia Nassar from Palestine, with a time of 31.97 seconds.

References

1982 births
Living people
Burkinabé female swimmers
Ivorian female swimmers
Olympic swimmers of Burkina Faso
Swimmers at the 2008 Summer Olympics
Burkinabé female freestyle swimmers
Sportspeople from Abidjan
21st-century Burkinabé people